The Championnat National 2, commonly known as National 2 and formerly known as Championnat de France Amateur (CFA), is a football league competition. The league serves as the fourth tier of the French football league system behind Ligue 1, Ligue 2, and the Championnat National. Contested by 64 clubs, the Championnat National 2 operates on a system of promotion and relegation with the Championnat National and the Championnat National 3, the fifth division of French football. Seasons run from August to May, with teams in four groups playing 32 games each totalling 1280 games in the season. Most games are played on Saturdays and Sundays, with a few games played during weekday evenings. Play is regularly suspended the last weekend before Christmas for two weeks before returning in the second week of January.

The Championnat de France amateur was initially founded by the French Football Federation in 1927 and was composed of the regional amateur league champions. The league served as the first division of French football until 1929 before the league was converted to the professional league that exists today in 1932. The current incarnation of the league is a simple rebrand of the CFA, which was founded in 1993 as National 2 and lasted for five years before being converted to the CFA name in 1998 and the National 2 name in 2017. Some clubs that participate in the league are semi-professional. The matches in the league attract on average between 800 and 1,000 spectators per match. However, this average is dragged down by the minuscule turnouts for the pros' home reserve matches.

History
The amateur championship of France was created in 1993 under the name National 2 as an heir to the now-defunct Division 3. The league's debut coincided with the creation of the Championnat National, the third division of French football, which is commonly known as National. For the first three years of the competition, an amateur champion was crowned in France regardless of whether the club was amateur or a reserve team. In 1998, the French Football Federation changed the competition's format creating two separate tables; one for the amateur clubs and another for the reserve teams of professional clubs. The dual tables allowed the league to declare a champion for the amateurs and the reserves with four team tournaments being held following the conclusion of league play to determine the champions. At the same time the competition was renamed Championnat de France Amateur (CFA). In 2001, the federation ended this style and reverted to the original format allowing both the amateur clubs and reserve teams to be grouped together based on their regional location. The winner of each group would then earn promotion to the Championnat National, unless the club is a reserve team. Meanwhile, the reserve teams continued to use the previous format with the best reserve teams of each group being inserted into a tournament to decide the reserves' champion.

In 2017 the FFF reorganised amateur football along the lines of the 2016 reorganisation of the Regions of France, creating Championnat National 2 and Championnat National 3 to replace CFA and CFA2. For National 2 this was in effect just a change of name, whilst National 3 saw a major restructure.

Competition format
Sixty-four clubs participate each season. The clubs are split into four parallel groups of 16 with their group affiliation being loosely based on the regional location. The league is open to the best reserve teams in France and amateur clubs in France, although only the amateur clubs are eligible for promotion to the Championnat National. During the course of a season, usually from August to May, each club plays the others in their respective group twice, once at their home stadium and once at that of their opponents, for a total of 30 games. Teams are ranked by total points, then goal difference, and then goals scored. At the end of each season, the club with the most points, regardless of the group, is crowned champion and promoted to the Championnat National. If points are equal, head-to-head match results, followed by the goal difference, and then goals scored determine the winner. If still equal, teams are deemed to occupy the same position. If there is a tie for the championship or for relegation, a play-off match at a neutral venue decides rank. The three other highest-placed amateur teams in the other groups are also promoted, while the 3 lowest-placed teams from each group are relegated to the Championnat National 3 and the eight winners of the eight groups and the top four second-place finishers from the Championnat National 3 are promoted in their place.

Teams
The following teams are competing in the Championnat National 2 for the 2022–23 season.

Group A

Group B

Group C

Group D

References

External links

Official Site of the Fédération française de football
Championnat National 2 Fixtures 

 

 
4
Sports leagues established in 1993
1993 establishments in France
Fra